Abdallah Laroui (born 7 November 1933) is a Moroccan philosopher, historian, and novelist. Besides some works in French, his philosophical project has been written mostly in Arabic. He is among the most read and discussed Arab and Moroccan philosophers.

Biography 
Laroui was born in 1933 in Azemmour. His mother died when he was two. He studied at the kuttab before entering the public primary school at seven, where he studied from 1941 to 1945. In 1945, he obtained a grant to study at the  College Sidi Mohammed in Marrakesh, where he stayed five years. Afterwards he studied at Lycée Lyautey in Casablanca from 1949 to 1951 and at Lycée Gouraud in Rabat from 1951 to 1953. He obtained his baccalauréat in 1953, and then studied history and economics, at the Institut d'Études Politiques in Paris, where he studied under  and Raymond Aron. In 1958, he obtained a Diplôme d'études supérieures. After receiving his agrégation in Islamic studies in June 1963, he was appointed as an assistant professor of history at the Mohammed V University in Rabat. In 1976, he defended his Doctorat d'Etat with a thesis titled "Les Origines sociales et culturelles du nationalisme marocain, 1830–1912" (Social and Cultural Origins of Moroccan Nationalism, 1830–1912) and published it in 1977. Laroui taught at the University Mohammed V until 2000. He has written five novels (o.a.  L'Exil (Sindbad-Actes Sud, 1998)).

Historian Albert Hourani describes him as a significant Arab thinker of the post-1967 era. Laroui's philosophy was guided by a Marxist reading of history and a commitment to radical critique of culture, language, and tradition.

Awards and honors

 In 2000, he was awarded the Premi Internacional Catalunya (Catalonia International Prize).
 In 2017, he was awarded the Sheikh Zayed Book Award for "Cultural Personality of the Year", the premier category with a prize of 1 million dirhams.

Partial bibliography

See also
Abdelwahab Benmansour

References

External links
 . Lecture by Abdallah Laroui, Fulbright 50th Anniversary Distinguished Fellow, (Lecture delivered at the Middle East Studies Association annual meeting in Providence, RI).

Moroccan writers in French
20th-century Moroccan historians
Moroccan novelists
Moroccan male writers
Male novelists
1933 births
Living people
People from Azemmour
Moroccan editors
Moroccan male journalists
Member of the Academy of the Kingdom of Morocco